Unedogemmula unedo is a species of sea snail, a marine gastropod mollusk in the family Turridae, the turrids.

Description
The length of the shell attains 49.7 mm.

Distribution
This marine species occurs off the Philippines, New Caledonia, the Solomon Islands; in the East China Sea; off Indonesia, Taiwan, Japan; off Northern Territory, Queensland, Western Australia (Australiaà

References

 Kiener, L.C. 1839-1840. Genre Pleurotome (Pleurotoma Lam.). 1-84, pls 1-27 in Spécies général et Iconographie des coquilles vivantes, comprenant la collection du Muséum d'histoire Naturelle de Paris, la collection de Lamarck, celle du Prince Massena (appartenant maintenant a M. le Baron B. Delessert) et les découvertes récentes des voyageurs. Paris : Rousseau Vol. 5. 
 Hirase, S. & Taki, I. 1951. A handbook of illustrated shells in natural colors from the Japanese Islands and adjacent territories. Tokyo : Bunkyokaku xxiv, 134 pp.
 Kira, T. 1954. Coloured Illustrations of the Shells of Japan. Osaka : Hoikusha Vol. 1 viii 172 pp. 67 pls, 24. 
 Garrard, T. A. (1961). Mollusca collected by M. V. Challenge off the east coast of Australia. Journal of the Malacological Society of Australia. 1(5): 3-38, 2 pls.
 MacNeil, F.S. 1960. Tertiary and Quaternary Gastropoda of Okinawa. United States Geological Survey Professional Papers 339: i-iv, 1-148, 19 pls 
 Powell, A.W.B. 1964. The Family Turridae in the Indo-Pacific. Part 1. The Subfamily Turrinae. Indo-Pacific Mollusca 1: 227-346
 Hinton, A. 1972. Shells of New Guinea and the central Indo-Pacific. Milton : Jacaranda Press xviii 94 pp.
 Tantanasiriwong, R. 1978. An illustrated checklist of marine shelled gastropods from Phuket Island, adjacent mainland and offshore islands, Western Peninsula, Thailand. Phuket Marine Biological Center, Research Bulletin 21: 1-22, 259 figs 
 Wilson, B. 1994. Australian marine shells. Prosobranch gastropods. Kallaroo, WA : Odyssey Publishing Vol. 2 370 pp.
 Tucker, J.K. 2004. Catalog of Recent and fossil turrids (Mollusca: Gastropoda). Zootaxa 682: 1–1295

External links
  J.C. Melvill (1910) Descriptions of Twenty-nine Species of Marine Mollusca from the Persian Gulf, Gulf of Oman, and North  Arabian Sea; The Annals and magazine of natural history; zoology, botany, and geology being a continuation of the Annals combined with Loudon and Charlesworth's Magazine of Natural History; 8th ser. vol. VI

unedo
Gastropods described in 1840